Whispering Canyon is a 1926 American silent drama film directed by Tom Forman and starring Jane Novak, Robert Ellis and Lee Shumway.

Cast
 Jane Novak as Antonia Lee 
 Robert Ellis as Bob Cameron 
 Lee Shumway as Lew Selby 
 Josef Swickard as Eben Beauregard 
 Eugene Pallette as Harvey Hawes 
 Jim Mason as Medbrook 
 Ed Brady as Gonzales

References

Bibliography
 Goble, Alan. The Complete Index to Literary Sources in Film. Walter de Gruyter, 1999.

External links

1926 films
1926 drama films
Silent American drama films
Films directed by Tom Forman
American silent feature films
1920s English-language films
American black-and-white films
1920s American films